Osteocephalus leoniae is a species of frogs in the family Hylidae.

It is endemic to Peru.
Its natural habitat is subtropical or tropical moist lowland forests.

References

Osteocephalus
Amphibians described in 2001
Frogs of South America
Taxonomy articles created by Polbot